New Hampshire's 23rd State Senate district is one of 24 districts in the New Hampshire Senate. It has been represented by Republican Bill Gannon since 2020, following his defeat of Democratic incumbent Jon Morgan. Gannon first represented the district from 2016-2018.

Geography
District 23 is based in Rockingham County. The district is entirely located within New Hampshire's 1st congressional district.

Rockingham County - 18.2%

 Seabrook
 Kensington
 South Hampton
 Newton
 Kingston
 East Kingston
 Brentwood
 Epping
 Fremont
 Sandown
 Danville
 Chester

Federal and statewide results in District 23 
Results are of elections held under 2022 district lines.

Recent election results

Historical election results
All election results below took place prior to 2012 redistricting, and thus were held under different district lines.

2020

2018

2016

2014

2012

2010

References

23
Rockingham County, New Hampshire